Andrei Vladimirovich Chuprina (born 24 September 1976, in Krasnodar) is a former Russian football player.

References

1976 births
Sportspeople from Krasnodar
Living people
Russian footballers
FC Zhemchuzhina Sochi players
Russian Premier League players
FC Volgar Astrakhan players
FC Angusht Nazran players

Association football defenders